Dè a-nis? (pronounced: Jaay a-neash) is a Scottish Gaelic-language children's program produced by BBC Gàidhlig. It is broadcast on BBC Alba on Wednesday nights at 6:00pm. "Dè a-nis" is Gaelic for "What Now?"

History
Launched on 30 September 1993 as part of an improved line-up of Scottish Gaelic-language programmes, Dè a-nis? was originally produced by CTG (Commataidh Telebhisein Gàidhlig). Originally, no presenters were used and individual programmes were used to fill up the hour.  Until 2011 the programmes was broadcast on BBC Two Scotland on Thursdays at 6pm, but with digital switch over the series is now only broadcast on BBC Alba

Magazine format
Since 1996, a magazine format has been used with live presenters, pop music, special reports, cartoons and viewers contacting the show. Since 2012 all the cartoons were dropped.

Specials
Dè a-nis? often presents special episodes covering a particular event, such as the opening of Bun-sgoil Ghàidhlig Inbhir Nis, St. Patrick's Day from Dublin and Galway and the mòd. For Children in Need 2007, Dè a-nis ran a number of events including Eilidh and Jo (from Aileag) cycling the length of the Western Isles and Sarah and Calum abseiling on the BBC Pacific Quay building and raising £865.

Programming
 Dealbhan Beo (1993–1995)
 Mirean Measgaichte (1993–1995)
 Orain agus Rannan (1993–1995) 
 Mire Mara (1993–1995)
 Spot the Dog (1993–1995)
 Noddy's Toyland Adventures (1994–1995)
 Iris, The Happy Professor (1994–1995)
 The Animals of Farthing Wood (1996–1997)
 Rugrats (1997–1999)
 Dennis the Menace (1998–1999)
 Rocket Power (2000–2001)
 The Adventures of Jimmy Neutron, Boy Genius (mid-2000s)

Current presenters
Derek MacIntosh
Kim Carnie 
 Megan MacLellan
 Annabel MacLennan
 Mark Smith

Past presenters
Mairi MacInnes
John Urquhart
Flora Anne MacLean
Tony Kearney
Evelyn Coull
Sarah Cruickshank
Martin MacDonald
Somhairle MacDonald
Calum MacAulay
Siobhan MacInnes
Colin MacLeod
Padraig MacQueen
Rhoda Meek
Shona Morrison
Shannon McFarlane (voice only)
Eilidh MacLennan
Penny Fraser (nee MacInnes)
Roddy MacKay
Lisa MacKinnon

External links

BBC children's television shows
1993 Scottish television series debuts
BBC Alba shows
Scottish Gaelic mass media
1990s Scottish television series
2000s Scottish television series
2010s Scottish television series
2020s Scottish television series
BBC Scotland television shows